The Woods is the seventh studio album by American alternative rock band Sleater-Kinney. It was released in 2005 on Sub Pop. The album was produced by Dave Fridmann and recorded in late 2004. The album received widespread critical acclaim.

Recording and production 

The Woods was produced by Dave Fridmann and recorded from November 2004 to December 2004 at Tarbox Road Studios in Cassadaga, New York. Much of the album was recorded live in the studio, as Fridmann consciously attempted to approximate the band's live sound on the record. The vocals and some of the guitar tracks were the only overdubs. The final two tracks, "Let's Call It Love" and "Night Light", were separate tracks on record but were actually recorded together in a single 15-minute take, after Carrie Brownstein realized that the two tracks were in the same key and could segue into one another.

Release 

The Woods was released on May 24, 2005, by Sub Pop, making it the band's first release on that label. Two songs from the album, "Entertain" and "Jumpers", were released as singles on May 10, 2005, and September 12, 2005, respectively. The album reached number 80 on the US Billboard Top 200 chart and number 2 on the Independent Albums chart. As of October 2005, The Woods had sold 59,000 copies in the U.S. according to Nielsen SoundScan. As of February 2015, The Woods had sold 94,000 copies.

Composition 
Musically, The Woods takes on "steaming [and] swaggering" hard rock and noise pop.

Critical reception 

The Woods received widespread critical acclaim. Kyle Ryan, writing for The A.V. Club, described the album as "a quasi-psychedelic, classic-rock-sounding epic", while Keith Harris of The Village Voice praised Corin Tucker's vocals. The album appeared at number four in The Village Voices Pazz & Jop critics' poll for 2005. Pitchfork placed it at number 127 on its list of "The Top 200 Albums of the 2000s". Similarly, Rolling Stone ranked The Woods at number 72 on its list of "100 Best Albums of the 2000s", and Tiny Mix Tapes placed it at number 89 on its list of "Favorite 100 Albums of the 2000s".

Track listing 
All songs written by Sleater-Kinney.

Personnel 

 Carrie Brownstein – guitar, vocals
 Corin Tucker – vocals, guitar
 Janet Weiss – drums, harmonica, backing vocals

 Technical

 Dave Fridmann – production, recording, mixing
 Greg Calbi – mastering
 Jeff Kleinsmith – sleeve design
 Michael Brophy – album cover painting
 John Clark – sleeve photography

References 

2005 albums
Albums produced by Dave Fridmann
Sleater-Kinney albums
Sub Pop albums
Albums recorded at Tarbox Road Studios